William H. Hunter (died 1842) was a U.S. Representative from Ohio for one term from 1837 to 1839.

Biography 
Born in Frankfort, Kentucky, Hunter completed preparatory studies and later studied law. He was admitted to the bar and commenced practice in Tiffin, Ohio. He moved to Norwalk, Ohio, about 1825 and continued the practice of his profession for several years. He subsequently moved to Sandusky, Ohio, and was appointed collector of customs there in 1835.

Hunter was elected as a Democrat to the Twenty-fifth Congress (March 4, 1837 – March 3, 1839).

Hunter died under mysterious circumstances near Sandusky in 1842. He was interred in the Cholera Cemetery.

Sources
 

1842 deaths
Politicians from Frankfort, Kentucky
Politicians from Sandusky, Ohio
People from Norwalk, Ohio
Ohio lawyers
Democratic Party members of the United States House of Representatives from Ohio
Year of birth unknown